Presidential elections were held in Uganda on 12 March 2001. The incumbent Yoweri Museveni won 69% of the vote and was elected to a second term. All candidates were independents, as political parties were banned at the time. Voter turnout was 70.3%.

Candidates
Yoweri Museveni was running for his second term in office in 2001. He took power in 1986 after winning a guerrilla war against President Tito Okello. Museveni's main rival was four-time rival Kizza Besigye, who was Museveni's personal physician and a military officer who broke ties with the NRM government in 2001.

Results

Post-election events
Besigye did not concede the race but instead requested a formal vote recount on the basis of voter fraud. Museveni also claimed that there was a "rigging" of the vote, albeit in Besigye's favour; he also remarked that he should have won 75% of the vote instead. The independent election watchdog Election Monitoring Group found voter fraud to be minimal. The same day after results were announced, a pipe bomb exploded in downtown Kampala, killing one woman; a similar explosion occurred on a minibus headed towards the capital, injuring three people. However, it was not immediately clear if the explosions were related to the presidential election. In a majority decision, the Supreme Court of Uganda subsequently rejected Besigye's petition for a recount. Shortly after being elected to a second term as president, Museveni pledged to step down before the next election but subsequently walked back on his promise.

References

Uganda
2001 in Uganda
Presidential elections in Uganda
Non-partisan elections
March 2001 events in Africa